East Hills is a state electoral district of the Legislative Assembly in the state of New South Wales, Australia. It is represented by  member Wendy Lindsay.

East Hills includes the suburbs of Condell Park, East Hills, Milperra, Padstow, Padstow Heights, Panania, Picnic Point, Revesby, Revesby Heights and parts of Bankstown, Bass Hill, Georges Hall and Yagoona.

Members for East Hills

Election results

References

East Hills
East Hills
1953 establishments in Australia